Tennessee County, North Carolina was a subdivision of the North Carolina's Washington District in the Overmountain Region—which later became the state of Tennessee.

History
Tennessee County was organized in 1788 from a portion of Davidson County, North Carolina.  Both were transferred, along with the state's five other western counties (the former Washington District), to Federal jurisdiction in 1790 and formed into the Southwest Territory.  The county was divided  into Montgomery and Robertson counties in 1796, when Tennessee became the nation's 16th state.  The land area formerly included in Tennessee County now forms Humphreys, Montgomery, and Robertson counties and portions of Stewart, Dickson, Cheatham, and Houston counties.

References

See also
List of former United States counties
History of Tennessee

Pre-statehood history of Tennessee
Former counties of North Carolina
1788 establishments in North Carolina
Populated places established in 1788
1796 disestablishments in the United States